Martins Bay is an indentation in the southwest coast of New Zealand's South Island. It lies immediately to the south of Big Bay and some 30 kilometres north of the mouth of Milford Sound at the northern tip of Fiordland. The Hollyford River reaches the Tasman Sea at Martins Bay.

The area around the bay is uninhabited, connected to the country only via the Hollyford Track, a popular tramping route. In the early days of European settlement, it was planned to be the harbour for a town, Jamestown, located immediately inland on the shores of Lake McKerrow. Jamestown was founded in 1872, but the terrain, weather, and difficulty of getting supplies to the township caused the project to fail. Today, little trace remains of either Jamestown or the port. Those pioneering days were the subject of Alice Mackenzie's book The Pioneers of Martins Bay, which recounted her childhood as a settler at Jamestown and Martins Bay.

The origin of the bay's name is uncertain, though it may have been the name of one of the surveyors who mapped the area in the 1870s, or of the captain of a sealing vessel.

References

Bays of Southland, New Zealand
Landforms of Fiordland
Ghost towns in Southland, New Zealand